Bennet Mills Allen (1877 – 1963) was an American zoologist, who was Professor of Zoology at the University of Kansas and later at  the University of California at Los Angeles. His research focused on the role of the endocrine system in development using amphibians as a model system.

Early life and education
Allen was born in Greencastle, Indiana on July 4, 1877. He received a bachelor's degree from DePauw University, followed by a doctorate from the University of Chicago in 1903 with a dissertation titled "The development of the ovary and the testis in the mammals" working under Charles Otis Whitman.

Academic career
After receiving his doctorate, Allen moved to the University of Wisconsin as a teacher, first in the Department of Anatomy, then in the Department of Zoology. In 1913, he moved to the University of Kansas becoming Professor of Zoology and head of the department. In 1922, he moved to the University of California at Los Angeles (UCLA), serving as the first chair of the Department of Zoology. In 1947, Allen retired from the Department of Zoology, but remained at the university for 11 years as a member of the Atomic Energy Project at UCLA. He retired from that project in 1958, but remained at UCLA associated with the Department of Radiology in the School of Medicine until his death in 1963.

Throughout his career, Bennet's research focused on the role of endocrine glands in development. He mostly completed this work using larval amphibians as a research model. He showed that the thyroid is required for the development of tadpoles into frogs, and characterized the role of various other endocrine glands in tadpole development. Later in his career, upon moving to the Atomic Energy Project, Bennet's shifted his research to the effects of radiation exposure on various tissues.

Awards and honors
Allen received an honorary Doctor of Science degree from DePauw University, and an honorary Doctor of Laws degree from the University of California.

References

American embryologists
DePauw University alumni
1877 births
1963 deaths